The Banankoni River in Mali is located in the Sikasso Region, in the southern part of the country, 280 km east of Bamako. Banankoni is part of the Niger River drainage basin.

References

Inner Niger Delta
Sikasso Region